This is a list of things named after Richard Dedekind. Richard Dedekind (1831–1916), a mathematician, is the eponym of all of the things (and topics) listed below.

19293 Dedekind
Cantor–Dedekind axiom
Dedekind completeness
Dedekind cut
Dedekind discriminant theorem
Dedekind domain
Dedekind eta function
Dedekind function
Dedekind group
Dedekind number
Dedekind's problem
Dedekind–Peano axioms
Dedekind psi function
Dedekind ring
Dedekind sum
Dedekind valuation
Dedekind zeta function
Dedekind–Hasse norm
Dedekind-infinite set
Dedekind–MacNeille completion
Dedekind's axiom
Dedekind's complementary module
Dedekind lattice
Jordan–Dedekind lattice
Dedekind's theorem on ellipsoids of equilibrium

Dedekind, Richard